Pseudohemihyalea ochracea is a moth in the family Erebidae. It was described by Walter Rothschild in 1909. It is found in Panama, Colombia and Costa Rica.

References

nimbipicta
Moths of Central America
Moths of South America
Taxa named by Walter Rothschild
Moths described in 1909